Dubno is a city in the Rivne Oblast of western Ukraine.

Dubno may also refer to:
 Dubno, Podlaskie Voivodeship, Poland
 Dubno (Příbram District), a village and municipality in the Central Bohemian Region, Czech Republic
 Dubno, Rimavská Sobota District, a village in the Banská Bystrica Region, Slovakia
 Dubno Raion, Rivne Oblast, Ukraine